Luther Burbank's Gold Ridge Experiment Farm is the official name of the  that remain of the farm originally purchased in 1885 by famed plant breeder Luther Burbank (1849-1926) in an area of Sebastopol, California, formerly known as the "Gold Ridge District". Burbank died in 1926.

In 1974, Burbank's widow Elizabeth Waters Burbank (1888-1977) donated the remaining  to the Sebastopol Area Housing Corporation for the purpose of erecting low-income, senior, and disabled housing units with the stipulation that the  parcel containing the "Caretaker's Cottage" (that had been constructed a year or two after an older cottage on the property was destroyed by the 1906 earthquake), the barn, the potting shed (destroyed by fire in the late 1960s) and over 250 living specimens of Burbank's work be set aside and left undisturbed as a historical and horticultural area, dedicated to Burbank, to be studied and enjoyed by future generations. Presently owned by the City of Sebastopol, it is administrated by the Western Sonoma County Historical Society and maintained entirely by volunteers.

History of Gold Ridge Farm
Faced with the need for more room in which to conduct his experiments in perennial plants, trees and shrubs than could be accommodated by his nursery at his home and gardens in Santa Rosa, Burbank purchased Gold Ridge Farm chiefly because of its subtle variations in environments, exposures and elevations. This allowed him to conduct experiments on plants that varied greatly in characteristics. In its heyday, some estimates put the number of Burbank's on-going plant experiments at Gold Ridge Farm at over 60,000 and tended by a crew of as many as 15 to 20 workers.

After Burbank's death in 1926, the remaining extant Burbank plants were cataloged by representatives from Stark Brothers Nursery in Missouri (an influential former client of Burbank's) after which the farm fell into disuse and disrepair until the mid-1970s.

The Western Sonoma County Historical Society was formed in Sebastopol at that time from the ranks of local  volunteers with the original mission of assuring the preservation and maintenance of Burbank's Gold Ridge Farm. This mission has expanded to presently include the West Sonoma County Museum (headquartered at the old train depot building in downtown Sebastopol), the Sebastopol Archives and the Triggs Reference Room and genealogical archives.

Today, Luther Burbank's Gold Ridge Experiment Farm is both a horticultural and historical museum where the public can, by docent or self-guided tour, view literally hundreds of the "living legacies" of the man once called "The Plant Wizard".

Location
The Western Sonoma County Historical Society and the West County Museum are located at 261 South Main Street in Sebastopol.

See also
Luther Burbank Home and Gardens

References

External links 
 

Botanical gardens in California
Museums in Sonoma County, California
Historical society museums in California
History of Sonoma County, California
Historic farms in the United States
Parks in Sonoma County, California
Buildings and structures in Sonoma County, California
Farms on the National Register of Historic Places in California
Gold Ridge Farm
Tourist attractions in Sonoma County, California
Sebastopol, California